In enzymology, a nucleoside-diphosphatase is an enzyme that catalyzes the chemical reaction

a nucleoside diphosphate + H2O  a nucleotide + phosphate

Thus, the two substrates of this enzyme are nucleoside diphosphate and H2O, whereas its two products are nucleotide and phosphate.

This enzyme belongs to the family of hydrolases, specifically those acting on acid anhydrides in phosphorus-containing anhydrides.  The systematic name of this enzyme class is nucleoside-diphosphate phosphohydrolase. Other names in common use include thiamine pyrophosphatase, UDPase, inosine diphosphatase, adenosine diphosphatase, IDPase, ADPase, adenosinepyrophosphatase, guanosine diphosphatase, guanosine 5'-diphosphatase, inosine 5'-diphosphatase, uridine diphosphatase, uridine 5'-diphosphatase, nucleoside diphosphate phosphatase, type B nucleoside diphosphatase, GDPase, CDPase, nucleoside 5'-diphosphatase, type L nucleoside diphosphatase, NDPase, and nucleoside diphosphate phosphohydrolase.  This enzyme participates in purine metabolism and pyrimidine metabolism.

Structural studies

References

External links
 

EC 3.6.1
Enzymes of known structure